Mitchell County is a county located in the U.S. state of Iowa. As of the 2020 census, the population was 10,565. The county seat is Osage. It is not clear whom the county is named after: the county website mentions John Mitchell, an early surveyor, and an Irish patriot John Mitchel.

History
Mitchell County was founded in 1851. It was named after John Mitchel, an Irish patriot.  The county's courthouse was completed in 1858, and it is listed on the National Register of Historic Places. The courthouse has since been razed.

Geography

Major highways
 U.S. Highway 218
 Iowa Highway 9

Adjacent counties
Mower County, Minnesota  (north)
Howard County  (east)
Floyd County  (south)
Cerro Gordo County  (southwest)
Worth County  (west)

Demographics

2020 census
There were 4,847 housing units, of which 4,382 were occupied.

2010 census
There were 4,850 housing units, of which 4,395 were occupied.

2000 census

According to the U.S. Census Bureau, Mitchell County's 99% White population makes it the county with the smallest percentage of minorities nationally.

As of the census of 2000, there were 10,874 people, 4,294 households, and 2,984 families residing in the county.  The population density was 23 people per square mile (9/km2). There were 4,594 housing units at an average density of 10 per square mile (4/km2). The racial makeup of the county was 99.27% White, 0.17% Black or African American, 0.07% Native American, 0.17% Asian, 0.02% Pacific Islander, 0.07% from other races, and 0.21% from two or more races; 0.58% of the population were Hispanic or Latino of any race.

There were 4,294 households, out of which 30.10% had children under the age of 18 living with them, 60.80% were married couples living together, 5.70% had a female householder with no husband present, and 30.50% were non-families. 27.60% of all households were made up of individuals, and 15.40% had someone living alone who was 65 years of age or older. The average household size was 2.47 and the average family size was 3.02.

In the county, the population was spread out, with 26.50% under the age of 18, 6.10% from 18 to 24, 24.20% from 25 to 44, 21.70% from 45 to 64, and 21.60% who were 65 years of age or older. The median age was 41 years. For every 100 females there were 95.70 males; for every 100 females aged 18 and over, there were 92.00 males.

The median income for a household in the county was $34,843, and the median income for a family was $41,233. Males had a median income of $29,601 versus $22,054 for females. The per capita income for the county was $16,809. About 7.00% of families and 10.70% of the population were below the poverty line, including 16.50% of those under age 18 and 8.10% of those age 65 or over.

Politics
Starting with Michael Dukakis's win in 1988, Mitchell County became a Democratic leaning county, voting for Democrats in all presidential elections through 2012. Mitchell County was the whitest county in the United States that voted for President Barack Obama, both in 2008 and 2012. In 2016, Trump became the first Republican to win it since Ronald Reagan in 1984, winning it by a 24% margin, the largest margin for a presidential candidate since 1968. He won it again in 2020, by an even larger 28% margin, the largest margin for any candidate since 1952. 2020 also marked the first time since 1960 that a Democrat was elected president without carrying Mitchell County.

Economy
In January 2017,  Mitchell County supervisors denied an application for an  Iowa Select contracted farm in Lincoln Township. It was planned for  5,000-hogs.

Communities

Cities

Carpenter
McIntire
Mitchell
Orchard
Osage
St. Ansgar
Stacyville

Census-designated places
Little Cedar
Meyer
Mona
New Haven
Otranto
Toeterville

Townships

Burr Oak
Cedar
Douglas
East Lincoln
Jenkins
Liberty
Mitchell
Newburg
Osage
Otranto
Rock
St. Ansgar
Stacyville
Union
Wayne
West Lincoln

Population ranking
The population ranking of the following table is based on the 2020 census of Mitchell County.

† county seat

See also

Mitchell County Courthouse
National Register of Historic Places listings in Mitchell County, Iowa

References

External links

Official site of Mitchell County, Iowa

 
1851 establishments in Iowa
Populated places established in 1851